FDHS may refer to:
 Field Deployable Hydrolysis System
 Fort Defiance High School, in Fort Defiance, Virginia, United States
 Fort Dorchester High School, in North Charleston, South Carolina, United States
 Frederick Douglass High School (disambiguation)

See also 
 FDH (disambiguation)